Kiyofumi (written: 清史 or 清文) is a masculine Japanese given name. Notable people with the name include:

 (born 1983), Japanese cyclist
 (born 1978), Japanese singer-songwriter

Japanese masculine given names